Illuminati Hotties are an American indie rock band from Los Angeles, California created and fronted by producer, mixer, and audio engineer Sarah Tudzin.

History
Sarah Tudzin began her career in music as a recording engineer. The Illuminati Hotties project started as an extension of her work, as a way to demonstrate her varied production capabilities. In 2018, Tudzin and her band released their debut full-length album, Kiss Yr Frenemies, on Tiny Engines.

In October 2019, Tudzin released a song for download called "ppl plzr", with all proceeds from the track going to the suicide prevention group The Trevor Project.

After it had "leaked" on July 3, 2020, Illuminati Hotties announced a mixtape, Free I.H: This Is Not the One You've Been Waiting For, would be released that month. An interview with Stereogum on July 10 made it clear it was connected to "an exit agreement that allowed Tudzin to buy out her Tiny Engines contract with a cash settlement and a payment of royalties on a future project" and would be released on  July 17.

On December 4, 2020, Illuminati Hotties contributed the song "xmas wish list (what we all asked for)" to the Christmas compilation 'Simply Having a Wonderful Compilation'.

In 2021, Tudzin announced she had partnered with Hopeless Records to create her own imprint label, Snack Shack Tracks. The first release on the imprint was the Illuminati Hotties song "MMMOOOAAAAAYAYA". On June 10, Illuminati Hotties released the single "Pool Hopping" and announced its third studio album, Let Me Do One More, that was released on October 1, 2021.

Discography

Albums

Mixtapes

Singles

Songwriting and production credits
The following are songwriting, production, mixing, and engineering credits for Sarah Tudzin.

References

Musical groups from Los Angeles
Musical groups established in 2018
Indie rock musical groups from California
2018 establishments in California
Hopeless Records artists
Tiny Engines artists